Al-Masana'a is a sub-district located in Thula District, 'Amran Governorate, Yemen. Al-Masana'a had a population of 8488 according to the 2004 census.

References 

Sub-districts in Thula District